Lieutenant General Philip Campose, PVSM, AVSM & Bar, VSM was the Vice Chief of Army Staff of the Indian Army and assumed office on 1 August 2014 succeeding General Dalbir Singh. He retired on 31 July 2015 and was succeeded by Lieutenant General Man Mohan Singh Rai.

Early life and education 
Campose is an alumnus of St. Xavier's School, Delhi; National Defence Academy, Pune and Indian Military Academy, Dehradun. He also completed various command courses from Defence Services Staff College, Wellington; National Defence College, New Delhi; the Higher Command Course at Army War College, Mhow and a tactical course in Russia. He holds a master's degree in philosophy in Defence Management and Security Studies and in Strategic Studies from Indore and Madras Universities respectively.

Career
Campose was commissioned into 9 Gorkha Rifles in 1974 and was later transferred to the Mechanised Infantry Regiment in 1982. He has vast operational and command experience including commander of a mechanized infantry battalion; commander of an infantry division near the Line of Control in Jammu and Kashmir; Brigade Major of an Armoured Brigade; Colonel of General Staff of a counter insurgency division in north-east India; Deputy Director General of Strategy at the Directorate of Perspective Planning; Chief Staff Officer (Land Vector) at the headquarters of Strategic Forces Command and Commander of XII Corps (Jodhpur). He has also served as an instructor at National Defence Academy, Defence Services Staff College and at the tactical wing of Armoured Corps Centre and School (ACCS). He was deputed to United Nations peace keeping missions in former Yugoslavia and northern Iraq. In 2013, on being promoted to the rank to Army Commander, he was appointed as the General Officer Commanding-in-Chief of the Western Command, prior to his appointment as the Vice Chief of the Army Staff (VCOAS) of Indian Army. He succeeded Lieutenant General Dalbir Singh as the Vice Chief of Army Staff, who was promoted to the rank of full general and  appointed as the Chief of the Army Staff. He was also the colonel commandant of the Mechanised Infantry Regiment.

During his career of more than four decades, he was awarded the Param Vishist Seva Medal (January 2015), Ati Vishisht Seva Medal** (January 2014 and January 2013) and Vishisht Seva Medal (January 2011) for his distinguished service to the country.

Awards and decorations

References

Living people
Malayali people
Military personnel from Kerala
Indian generals
20th-century Indian military personnel
21st-century Indian military personnel
Indian Christians
Vice Chiefs of Army Staff (India)
Year of birth missing (living people)
National Defence College, India alumni
Recipients of the Param Vishisht Seva Medal
Recipients of the Ati Vishisht Seva Medal
Recipients of the Vishisht Seva Medal
Army War College, Mhow alumni
Defence Services Staff College alumni